Streatfeild or Streatfield is a surname originating from the name of a lost village near Robertsbridge, East Sussex.

Robert Streatfeild (1514–1599), from Chiddingstone, Kent and earliest known ancestor of many lines of Streatfeild and Streatfield from Kent, Surrey and Sussex
Alexander Streatfeild-Moore (1863–1940), English cricketer
David Streatfield, historian of landscape architecture, professor in the Department of Landscape Architecture at the University of Washington
Geoffrey Streatfeild (judge) (1897–1979), English High Court judge
Geoffrey Streatfeild (born 1975), English actor
Henry Streatfeild (1706–1762), substantial British landowner
Noel Streatfeild (1895–1986), British author, known for her children's books
Ruth Gervis (née Streatfeild) (1894-19??), sister to Noel, British illustrator
Philip Streatfeild (1879–1915), English painter and bohemian
Richard Streatfeild (1559–1601), British iron master from Kent
Richard Streatfeild (cricketer) (1833–1877), English cricketer
R. A. Streatfeild (1866–1919), English musicologist and critic
Sidney Streatfeild (1894–1966), Scottish Unionist Party politician
Simon Streatfeild (1929–2019), British-Canadian violist and conductor
Thomas Streatfeild (1777–1848), British antiquarian and churchman
William Champion Streatfeild (1865–1929), briefly Anglican Bishop of Lewes, father of Ruth and Noel

References